Fisher Home is an unincorporated community in central Alberta in Leduc County, located  north of Highway 13,  southwest of Leduc.

Localities in Leduc County